Ahmad Azlan bin Zainal (born 16 April 1986) is a Malaysian Footballer who plays for Kingstown Klang FC as a defender. He was also a member of Malaysia's national team.

Born and grew up in Kuala Lumpur Azlan spend his teenage years in Bukit Jalil Sports School, Azlan later played for Perak President Team. Before being promoted onto Perak senior side.

Azlan began his career with Perak as a youth player in 2004. He helped Perak win the FA Cup Final in 2004 against Terengganu FA by 3-0 in Bukit Jalil Stadium. He also brings Perak FA reach the 2007 Malaysia Cup final, which they lost to Kedah FA, 3-0.

He made his senior international debut against New Zealand on 23 February 2006. Serve as captain of Malaysia's Under-20 team at the AFC Youth Championship 2004, where he scored one goal in the tournament. He also turned out for Malaysia's national Under-23 side at the 2006 Doha Asian Games, SEA Games 2006 in Manila, Philippines and was part of Malaysia's Under-23 squad which won the 2007 Merdeka Tournament.

He joined Kelantan FA for the 2009 season  which ended prematurely due to a severe injury when he ruptured his anterior cruciate ligaments.

After being released by Kelantan, Azlan was signed by Kuala Lumpur  as a free agent halfway through the 2010 season.

He agreed to join PKNS FC for the 2012 Malaysia Super League.

2016  - Azlan signed for his hometown, Kuala Lumpur after so long plying his trade for other team.

References

http://matbiografi.blogspot.my/2016/04/skuad-olimpik-malaysia-2007.html

http://www.kosmo.com.my/kosmo/content.asp?y=2009&dt=0305&pub=Kosmo&sec=Sukan&pg=su_03.htm

http://www.thestar.com.my/story/?file=/2009/3/4/sports/3399301&sec=

http://kisahbolasepak.com/malaysia-pemain-pertahanan.html

https://web.archive.org/web/20160830143056/http://www.sinarharian.com.my/mobile/ultras/terengganu-miliki-pasukan-serba-lengkap-1.320543

External links
 Player Summary Ahmad Azlan Bin Zainal
 
 https://web.archive.org/web/20161124221126/http://m.aipsmedia.com/index.php?page=news&cod=957&tp=n

1986 births
Living people
Malaysian footballers
Malaysia international footballers
Perak F.C. players
PKNS F.C. players
Kelantan FA players
Kuala Lumpur City F.C. players
Terengganu FC players
Sportspeople from Kuala Lumpur
Footballers at the 2006 Asian Games
Malaysian people of Malay descent
Association football defenders
Asian Games competitors for Malaysia